Schmidt Spiele is a German games publisher for a wide variety of games, especially German-style board games.

Founder Josef Friedrich Schmidt developed Mensch ärgere dich nicht in 1907/1908, based on antique forerunners. Five years later his new publishing firm began the game's serial production. The firm expanded their range of products to include a very wide range of games of all kinds.

In the 1980s, Schmidt Spiele published the highly successful German role-playing game Das Schwarze Auge (The Dark Eye).

Josef Friedrich Schmidt's son Franz founded his own independent enterprise named Schmidt Spiele in Nuremberg prior to the Second World War (seated in Munich after the war). The two enterprises maintained a shared channel of distribution, and merged in 1970. The firm's complete archives were lost in a fire in the 1970s.

Schmidt Spiele went bankrupt in 1997 and were bought up by the Blatz-Gruppe who subsequently maintained the vastly better known brand name Schmidt Spiele, publishing their own games under this name as well.

Schmidt Spiele is run as a GmbH (Schmidt Spiele GmbH). In 2006 their turnover was reportedly 33.5 million Euro.

External links
 http://www.schmidtspiele.de/ (Schmidt Spiele homepage - German)

Board game publishing companies
Publishing companies of Germany
Manufacturing companies established in 1907
Design companies established in 1907
1907 establishments in Germany
Companies based in Nuremberg